Prostanthera decussata, commonly known as dense mintbush, species of flowering plant that is endemic south-eastern Australia. It is a dense, compact, strongly aromatic shrub with egg-shaped leaves and mauve to violet flowers with yellow streaks, arranged in leaf axils near the ends of branchlets.

Description
They are dark green on top and paler on the underside. Flowering occurs from October to March.

Taxonomy and naming
This species was formally described in 1859 by Victorian Government Botanist Ferdinand von Mueller in Fragmenta phytographiae Australiae, based on plant material collected in mountainous country near the Macalister River in Victoria. The specific epithet (decussata) is from the Latin decussatus meaning "formed crosswise like the letter X".

Distribution and habitat
Dense mintbush grows in heath, forest and woodland in the eastern half of Victoria, in the Australian Capital Territory and mainly in the south-eastern part of New South Wales.

References

decussata
Flora of the Australian Capital Territory
Flora of New South Wales
Flora of Victoria (Australia)
Lamiales of Australia
Plants described in 1859
Taxa named by Ferdinand von Mueller